Al Muharraq Stadium, also known as the Sheikh Ali bin Mohammed Al Khalifa Stadium, is a multi-use stadium situated in Arad, Bahrain. It is used mostly for football matches and is the home ground of Muharraq Club.  The stadium holds 20,000 people. 

The stadium underwent maintenance works for a month during September 2012.

References

Football venues in Bahrain